"Why Don't You Spend the Night" is a song written by Bob McDill, and recorded by American country music artist Ronnie Milsap.  It was released in January 1980 as the first single from the album Milsap Magic.  The song was Milsap's thirteenth number one on the country chart.  The single spent a week at number one and a total of eleven weeks on the chart. A version by the Canadian duo Jameson Booker reached number 17 in the Canadian AC charts, August 1980.

Chart performance

Year-end charts

References

Ronnie Milsap songs
1980 singles
Songs written by Bob McDill
RCA Records singles
1980 songs